European Day of the Entrepreneur or abbreviated as EDE, is a European brand that promotes entrepreneurship and it was initiated in Barcelona, Spain as a direct result of the Lisbon Strategy in 1999. EDE includes activities for youth, public, politicians and it is a tool that is used to promote entrepreneurship in order to create growth in jobs.

EDE is organized in several European cities, towns and local communities and it is supported, to mention a few, by the European Commission, the European Academy of Arts and Sciences, Konrad Adenauer Stiftung, and others.

External links
(1) https://web.archive.org/web/20090528091126/http://www.turku.fi/Public/default.aspx?culture=en-US&contentlan=2&nodeid=8917

Entrepreneurship organizations
Economy of the European Union
European Commission